Henry Peach Robinson (9 July 1830, Ludlow, Shropshire – 21 February 1901, Royal Tunbridge Wells, Kent) was an English pictorialist photographer best known for his pioneering combination printing - joining multiple negatives or prints to form a single image; an early example of photomontage. He joined vigorously in contemporary debates in the photographic press and associations about the legitimacy of 'art photography' and in particular the combining of separate images into one.

Life
Robinson was the oldest of four children of John Robinson, a Ludlow schoolmaster, and his wife Eliza. He was educated at Horatio Russell's academy in Ludlow until he was thirteen, when he took a year's drawing tuition with Richard Penwarne before being apprenticed to a Ludlow bookseller and printer, Richard Jones.

While continuing to study art, his initial career was in bookselling, in 1850 working for the Bromsgrove bookseller Benjamin Maund, then in 1851 for the London-based Whittaker & Co. In 1852 he exhibited an oil painting, On the Teme Near Ludlow, at the Royal Academy. That same year he began taking photographs, and five years later, following a meeting with the photographer Hugh Welch Diamond, decided to devote himself to that medium, in 1855 opening a studio in Leamington Spa, selling portraits.

In 1856, with Rejlander, he was a founding member of the Birmingham Photographic Society.

In 1859 he married Selina Grieves, daughter of a Ludlow chemist, John Edward Grieves. His son, Ralph Winwood Robinson, was also a photographer.

In 1864, at the age of 34, Robinson was forced to give up his studio due to ill-health from exposure to toxic photographic chemicals. Gernsheim (1962) has shown that thereafter he preferred the easier 'scissors and paste-pot' method of making his combination prints, rather than the more exacting darkroom method employed by Rejlander.

Relocating to London, Robinson kept up his involvement with the theoretical side of photography, writing the influential essay Pictorial Effect in Photography (1869), Being Hints on Composition and Chiaroscuro for Photographers, published in 1868. Around this time his health had improved sufficiently to open a new studio in Tunbridge Wells with Nelson King Cherrill, and in 1870 he became vice-president of the Royal Photographic Society.  He advocated strongly for photography to be regarded as an art form.

The partnership with Cherrill dissolved in 1875, Robinson continuing the business until his retirement in 1888. His son, Ralph Winwood Robinson, took over the studio business. Following internal disputes within the Photographic Society, he resigned in 1891 to become one of the early members of the rival Linked Ring society, in which he was active until 1897, when he was also elected an honorary member of the Royal Photographic Society.

Robinson was an early supporter of the Photographic Convention of the United Kingdom and took part in this institution's long running debates about photography as an art form. He was invited to serve as the President of the PCUK in 1891 but, as he described later, 'I felt compelled to decline, knowing that I could not carry out the duties as they should be carried out, having a defect of voice which would not allow me to read my own address'. He was subsequently persuaded to serve as President in 1896, when his presidential speeches were read out by a colleague.

He died aged 70 and was buried in Tunbridge Wells in early 1901.

Works

He was one of the most prominent art photographers of his day. His third and the most famous composite picture, "Fading Away" (1858) was both popular and fashionably morbid. He was a follower of the pre-Raphaelites and was influenced by the aesthetic views of John Ruskin. In his Pre-Raphaelite phase he attempted to realize moments of timeless significance in a "mediaeval" setting, anticipating the work of Julia Margaret Cameron, Burne-Jones and the Symbolists. According to his letters, he was influenced by the paintings of J.M.W. Turner. He defended composite photography, asserting that the creation of combination photographs were as demanding of the photographer as paintings were of the artist. Robinson compared the making of Fading Away with Zeuxis' legendary combining of the best features of five young ladies from Crotona to produce his picture of Helena.

Collections
Robinson's work is held in the permanent collections of several institutions, including the Johnson Museum of Art, the Clark Art Institute, the Seattle Art Museum, the Saint Louis Art Museum, the George Eastman Museum, the Worcester Art Museum, the SFMOMA, the University of Michigan Museum of Art, the LACMA, the Harvard Art Museums, the Princeton University Art Museum, the Metropolitan Museum of Art, the J. Paul Getty Museum, and the National Gallery of Victoria.

Publications
Robinson was author of a number of texts in which he promoted the photography as an art form, his books being widely used photographic reference material in the late 19th century.
Robinson, H.P. Pictorial Effect in Photography: Being Hints On Composition And Chiaroscuro For Photographers. London: Piper & Carter, 1869.
Robinson, H.P. and William de Wiveleslie Abney. The Art And Practice of Silver Printing. NY: E. & H.T. Anthony & Co., 1881.
Robinson, H.P. Picture-Making By Photography. London: Hazell, Watson, & Viney, 1889.
Robinson, H.P. Art photography in short chapters London: Hazell Watson & Viney. 1890
Robinson, H.P. Photography as a business. Bradford [Eng.] Percy Lund. 1890
Robinson, H.P. The Studio And What To Do in It. London: Piper & Carter, 1891.
Robinson, H.P. The elements of a pictorial photograph. Bradford : Percy Lund & Co. 1896.
Robinson, H.P. Catalogue of pictorial photographs. Ralph W. Robinson. Redhill, Surrey. 1901

Books about Henry Peach Robinson

 Handy, Ellen (2004) "Robinson, Henry Peach (1830–1901)", Oxford Dictionary of National Biography, Oxford University Press, 2004 accessed 17 Dec 2007

References

External links

Fading Away - From George Eastman House
Henry Peach Robinson  - From MuseumSyndicate
Henry Peach Robinson - From J. Paul Getty Museum
Henry Peach Robinson (1830-1901) - From British Council and M.I. Rudomino All-Russia State Library for Foreign Literature
Henry Peach Robinson 1830-1901 - From PSS (Photographic Society of Scotland) Exhibitors
Robinson, Henry Peach - From "A History of Photography from its beginnings till the 1920s" by Robert Leggat
 
 

1830 births
1901 deaths
19th-century English male artists
19th-century English photographers
People from Ludlow
Photographers from Shropshire
Pioneers of photography